Okavango may refer to:

Geographical features 

 Okavango River, a river in southwest Africa, which drains into the Okavango Delta
 Okavango Delta, a delta in Botswana
 Okavango Basin, an endorheic basin that includes the Okavango River and Okavango Delta.

Administrative units 

 Kavango Region, a region of Namibia, named Okavango until 1998

Others 

 Geely Okavango, a sport utility vehicle model

See also
Kavango (disambiguation)